{{DISPLAYTITLE:Zeta1 Scorpii}}

Zeta1 Scorpii (Zeta1 Sco, ζ1 Scorpii, ζ1 Sco) is a B-type hypergiant star in the constellation of Scorpius.  It has an apparent visual magnitude which varies between 4.66 and 4.86.  It is a member of the Scorpius OB1 association, and the open star cluster NGC 6231, also known as the "Northern jewel box" cluster. Around 36 times as massive as the Sun, it is also one of the most luminous stars known in the Galaxy, with an estimated bolometric luminosity of around 850,000 times that of the Sun and a radius 103 times that of the Sun.

ζ1 Scorpii forms a naked eye double with ζ2 Scorpii, but the stars are merely coincidentally near in the line of sight from Earth. ζ2 is a mere 155 light years distant and much less luminous in real terms. ζ1 Scorpii can also be distinguished from ζ2, due to the latter's orange hue especially in long-exposure photographs.

ζ1 Scorpii is a candidate luminous blue variable (cLBV), a star with the luminosity and spectral appearance of an LBV, but one that has not yet shown the characteristic types of variability. It has been classified as dormant or ex-S Doradus variable, an older name for LBVs.

References

Scorpius (constellation)
B-type hypergiants
082671
Scorpii, Zeta1
152236
Emission-line stars
6262
CD-42 11633